Altlichtenberg is a populated place in Upper Austria, Austria. It is part (Ortsteil) of Lichtenberg. As of 1 January 2019, population was 1,174.

References

Cities and towns in Urfahr-Umgebung District